Atoyac de Álvarez  is a city and seat of the municipality of Atoyac de Álvarez, in the state of Guerrero, south-western Mexico.  It was affected by Hurricane Manuel in 2013.

References

Populated places in Guerrero